Delaila Amega (born 21 September 1997) is a Dutch handball player for Borussia Dortmund and the Dutch national team.

She represented the Netherlands at the 2019 World Women's Handball Championship.

International honours 
EHF Cup:
Semi-finalist: 2017

References

External links

1997 births
Living people
Dutch sportspeople of Ghanaian descent
People from Heerhugowaard
Dutch female handball players
Expatriate handball players
Dutch expatriate sportspeople in Germany
Sportspeople from North Holland
21st-century Dutch women